Ciarán Hinds is an Irish actor who is known for his performances on the screen and stage. He has appeared in various film and television projects, as well as in numerous stage productions. His notable films include The Cook, the Thief, His Wife & Her Lover (1989), Persuasion (1995), Oscar and Lucinda (1997), Road to Perdition (2002), Munich (2005), Amazing Grace (2007), There Will Be Blood (2007), In Bruges (2008), Miss Pettigrew Lives for a Day (2008), Harry Potter and the Deathly Hallows – Part 2 (2011), Tinker Tailor Soldier Spy (2011), Silence (2016), First Man (2018), and Belfast (2021), the latter for which he received an Academy Award nomination for Best Supporting Actor. His television roles include Gaius Julius Caesar in the series Rome, DCI James Langton in Above Suspicion, and Mance Rayder in Game of Thrones. He has continuously worked in the theatre throughout the majority of his career, having spent a major part of his time with the Royal Shakespeare Company, the Royal National Theatre, and six seasons with the Glasgow Citizens' Theatre.

Film

Television

Theatre

References

Male actor filmographies
British filmographies